Mponeng is a gold mine in South Africa's Gauteng province. Previously known as Western Deep Levels #1 Shaft, the underground and surface works were commissioned in 1987. It is also currently the world's deepest mine from ground level, reaching a depth of 4 km (2.5 mi) below ground level. The trip from the surface to the bottom of the mine takes over an hour.

Over 5400 metric tonnes of rock are excavated from Mponeng each day. At a price of $19.4 per gram of gold, the mine only needs to extract 10 grams of gold per ton excavated to remain profitable. The mine contains at least two gold reefs, with the deepest one metre thick.

Harmony Gold purchased Mponeng from AngloGold Ashanti in September 2020. Along with AGA's Mine Waste Solutions, Harmony paid approximately $300m.

Physical conditions
The temperature of the rock reaches , and the mine pumps slurry ice underground to cool the tunnel air to below . A mixture of concrete, water, and rock is packed into excavated areas, which further acts as an insulator. Tunnel walls are secured by flexible shotcrete reinforced with steel fibers, which is further held in place by diamond-mesh netting.

In 2008, researchers looking for extremophile organisms discovered the bacterium Desulforudis audaxviator present within groundwater samples from kilometers deep in the mine.

In popular culture
Danny Forster visited the mine for the fifth episode of Build It Bigger's eighth season.

Millan Ludeña, an Ecuadorian marathon runner, became the first person to run a half-marathon fully underground in the deepest part of Mponeng Gold Mine. A Guinness World Records adjudicator was on hand to document the race and issued the certificate for the deepest half-marathon.

References

Gold mines in South Africa
Economy of Gauteng